Bellabeg (an anglicisation of Scottish Gaelic: Am Baile Beag, 'the small farmtown') is a small roadside settlement in Strathdon, Aberdeenshire, Scotland. Amenities in Bellabeg include a Spar shop, a village hall, a green where the Highland Games are held, and the road to Lost with the famous signs pointing to "Lost".

Bellabeg lies on the north side of the River Don opposite the village of Strathdon.

See also
Doune of Invernochty

External links

Free Historical Maps for the county of Aberdeenshire - B

Villages in Aberdeenshire